Dieselnoi Chor Thanasukarn (born December 27, 1961 as Charin Sorndee) is a Thai former lightweight Muay Thai kickboxer and undefeated Lumpinee Stadium champion.

Biography and career
Dieselnoi (Little Diesel) was born in Tambon Huakoon, Nakhon Luang, Ayutthaya province.  He started practicing Muay Thai at the age of 13 with his father and elder brother at the Sor Banchongsak training camp under the guidance of Banchong Ngarm-ket. According to the Thai tradition, his first fighting name was Dieselnoi Sor Banchongsak, named in the honor of his first gym. He made his muaythai debut in the 32 kg weight division. After 4–5 bouts, he changed camp and fought under the name of Dieselnoi Sor Vorakulchai at Sri Ratcha, Chonburi. In 1977, he changed his name again and boxed for the Sor.Thanikul camp, owned by famous promotor Klaew Thanikul.

In 1981, Dieselnoi fought Koapong Sittichuchai and won the Lumpinee Stadium Lightweight (135 lbs) championship title. It was their third meeting after one knock out win each in their previous fights. Due to a lack of challengers he would remain idle for 15 months. His next fight was at the World Free-style Martial Arts Championship held in Bangkok, in April 1982, taking the 135 lb division in the finals vs the Japanese kickboxer Shinobu Onuki. Then on December 24, 1982, Dieselnoi fought Samart Payakaroon meeting at catch weight 132 lbs in a superfight. Dieselnoi weighed in at 129.7 to prove that he could have reached 130 lbs. He outscored the 1981 Fighter of the Year Samart with his trademark knee attacks. It was one of the biggest muaythai fights in 1980's with Samart taking a purse of 350,000 and Dieselnoi a purse of 400,000 baht, a record at the time. Dieselnoi was awarded the prestigious Sports Writer's 1982 Fighter of the Year Award. Dieselnoi reigned over the lightweight division for 17 more months without any challengers. On June 7 he faced Sagat Petchyindee at Rajadamnern Stadium at catch weight (132 lbs). It was again Dieselnoi's overpowering knee strikes that won him the bout. Then Dieselnoi would fly to America and face the American kickboxer John Moncayo, who was given a 5 kg advantage on the scale, in a modified rules fight (no elbows). Dieselnoi was victorious. When he returned to Thailand he then faced Sagat a second time, on October 6, 1984 in Ubon Ratchthani, winning on points again. Dieselnoi's final two fights were vs Krongsak Prakong-Boranrat. They would fight to a draw at Rajadamnern Stadium in Bangkok on August 8, 1985, and then Dieselnoi would beat him on points on November 12, 1985 at Lumpinee Stadium. Both fights at 132 lbs. After being the champion for four consecutive years he was eventually stripped from his 135 lb Lumpinee title and forced to retire because there was nobody in the weight division left to contest the belt.

Titles and accomplishments
Lumpinee Stadium
 1981 Lumpinee Stadium Lightweight champion
World Free-style Martial Arts
 1982 WFMA 135 lbs Champion
Sports Writers Association of Thailand
 1982 Fight of the Year (vs Samart Payakaroon)
 1984 Fight of the Year (vs Sagat Petchyindee)
 1985 Fight of the Year (vs Krongsak Prakong-Boranrat)
Awards
 1982 Muay Thai Fighter of the Year
 Siam Kela Muay Thai Hall of Fame
 2022 WBC Diamond Belt - Otorgado por Bang Rajan Events en reconocimiento a su carrera. 15 de Octubre - Madrid, España.

Professional boxing record

Muay Thai record

|-  style="background:#cfc;"
| 1985-11-12 || Win||align=left| Krongsak Na Theerawong || Lumpinee Stadium || Bangkok, Thailand || Decision || 5 || 3:00
|-
! style=background:white colspan=9 |
|-  style="background:#c5d2ea;"
| 1985-08-08 || Draw||align=left| Krongsak Na Theerawong || Rajadamnern Stadium || Bangkok, Thailand || Decision || 5 || 3:00
|-  style="background:#cfc;"
| 1984-10-06 || Win||align=left| Sagat Petchyindee || || Isan, Thailand || Decision || 5 || 3:00
|-
! style=background:white colspan=9 |
|-  style="background:#cfc;"
| 1984-07-14 || Win||align=left| John Moncayo |||| Los Angeles, United States || KO (Knees)|| 3 ||
|-  style="background:#cfc;"
| 1984-06-07 || Win||align=left| Sagat Petchyindee || Rajadamnern Stadium || Bangkok, Thailand || Decision || 5 || 3:00
|-  style="background:#cfc;"
| 1982-12-24 || Win||align=left| Samart Payakaroon || Rajadamnern Stadium || Bangkok, Thailand || Decision || 5 || 3:00
|-  style="background:#cfc;"
| 1982-04-28 || Win||align=left| Shinobu Onuki || Rajadamnern Stadium - World Freestyle Martial Arts Final || Bangkok, Thailand || KO (Knees) || 1||  1:26
|-
! style=background:white colspan=9 |
|-  style="background:#cfc;"
| 1982-04-25 || Win||align=left| Lee Jae Yong || Rajadamnern Stadium - World Freestyle Martial Arts Semi Final || Bangkok, Thailand || KO || 1||

|-  style="background:#cfc;"
| 1982-01-25 || Win||align=left| Padejsuk Pitsanurachan ||  || Bangkok, Thailand || Decision || 5 || 3:00
|-  style="background:#cfc;"
| 1981-09-18 || Win||align=left| Pennoi Sakornpitak || Lumpinee Stadium || Bangkok, Thailand || Decision || 5 || 3:00
|-  style="background:#cfc;"
| 1981-03-26 || Win||align=left| Raktae Muangsurin || Rajadamnern Stadium - Raja vs Lpn champion || Bangkok, Thailand || Decision || 5|| 3:00
|-  style="background:#cfc;"
| 1981-01-09 || Win||align=left| Kaopong Sitichuchai || Lumpinee Stadium || Bangkok, Thailand || Decision || 5|| 3:00  
|-
! style=background:white colspan=9 |
|-  style="background:#fbb;"
| 1980-09-26 || Loss||align=left| Kaopong Sitichuchai || Lumpinee Stadium || Bangkok, Thailand || KO (Punches)|| 2 ||
|-  style="background:#cfc;"
| 1980-07-08 || Win||align=left| Kaopong Sitichuchai || Lumpinee Stadium || Bangkok, Thailand || KO (Knee to the head)|| 3 ||
|-
! style=background:white colspan=9 |
|-  style="background:#cfc;"
| 1980-04-28 || Win||align=left| Padejsuk Pitsanurachan || Rajadamnern Stadium || Bangkok, Thailand || Decision|| 5 || 3:00
|-  style="background:#cfc;"
| 1980-03-05 || Win||align=left| Pennoi Sakornpitak || Rajadamnern Stadium || Bangkok, Thailand || Decision || 5 || 3:00
|-  style="background:#cfc;"
| 1980-01-22 || Win||align=left| Vicharnnoi Porntawee || Lumpinee Stadium || Bangkok, Thailand || Decision || 5 || 3:00
|-
! style=background:white colspan=9 |
|-  style="background:#cfc;"
| 1979-10-09 || Win||align=left| Posai Sitiboonlert || Lumpinee Stadium || Bangkok, Thailand || Decision || 5 || 3:00
|-  style="background:#fbb;"
| 1979-08-02 || Loss ||align=left| Prawit Sritham || Rajadamnern Stadium || Bangkok, Thailand || Decision || 5 || 3:00
|-  style="background:#cfc;"
| 1979-06-26 || Win||align=left| Khaosod Sitphraprom || Lumpinee Stadium || Bangkok, Thailand || Decision || 5 || 3:00
|-  style="background:#fbb;"
| 1979-03-01 || Loss ||align=left| Padejsuk Pitsanurachan || Rajadamnern Stadium || Bangkok, Thailand || TKO (Doctor Stoppage)|| 4 ||
|-  style="background:#fbb;"
| 1979-01-17 || Loss ||align=left| Vicharnnoi Porntawee || Rajadamnern Stadium || Bangkok, Thailand || Decision || 5 || 3:00
|-  style="background:#cfc;"
| 1978-12-06 || Win||align=left| Narongnoi Kiatbandit || Rajadamnern Stadium || Bangkok, Thailand || Decision || 5 || 3:00
|-  style="background:#fbb;"
| 1978-10-12 || Loss ||align=left| Vicharnnoi Porntawee || Rajadamnern Stadium || Bangkok, Thailand || Decision || 5 || 3:00
|-
! style=background:white colspan=9 |
|-  style="background:#cfc;"
| 1978-07-31 || Win||align=left| Nongkhai Sor.Prapatsorn || Rajadamnern Stadium || Bangkok, Thailand || Decision || 5 || 3:00
|-  style="background:#cfc;"
| 1978-06-21 || Win||align=left| Tawanook Sitpoonchai || Rajadamnern Stadium || Bangkok, Thailand || Decision || 5 || 3:00
|-  style="background:#cfc;"
| 1978-05-04 || Win||align=left| Fahkaew Surakorsrang || Rajadamnern Stadium || Bangkok, Thailand || Decision || 5 || 3:00
|-  style="background:#cfc;"
| 1978-02-27 || Win||align=left| Singnum Phetanin || Rajadamnern Stadium || Bangkok, Thailand || Decision || 5 || 3:00
|-  style="background:#cfc;"
| 1978-01- || Win||align=left| Saknarongnoi Chor Chutirat|| Rajadamnern Stadium || Bangkok, Thailand || Decision || 5 || 3:00
|-  style="background:#cfc;"
| 1977- || Win||align=left| Chatchanoi Phasingkamran || Rajadamnern Stadium || Bangkok, Thailand || Decision || 5 || 3:00
|-  style="background:#cfc;"
| 1977-12-09 || Win||align=left| Paruhat Longnern || Rajadamnern Stadium || Bangkok, Thailand || Decision || 5 || 3:00
|-  style="background:#cfc;"
| 1977-10-18 || Win||align=left| Kingthong Sakornpitak || Lumpinee Stadium || Bangkok, Thailand || Decision || 5 || 3:00
|-  style="background:#cfc;"
| 1977- || Win||align=left| Daotong Sityodtong || Lumpinee Stadium || Bangkok, Thailand || Decision || 5 || 3:00
|-  style="background:#cfc;"
| 1977- || Win||align=left| Noklek Singtaongsak || Lumpinee Stadium || Bangkok, Thailand || Decision || 5 || 3:00
|-  style="background:#cfc;"
| 1977- || Win||align=left| Phansuknoi Kwinchumphae || Lumpinee Stadium || Bangkok, Thailand || Decision || 5 || 3:00
|-  style="background:#cfc;"
| 1977- || Win||align=left| Pichit Kweangmichai || Lumpinee Stadium || Bangkok, Thailand || Decision || 5 || 3:00
|-  style="background:#cfc;"
| 1977- || Win||align=left| Numraman Sitmuhamat || Lumpinee Stadium || Bangkok, Thailand || Decision || 5 || 3:00
|-  style="background:#cfc;"
| 1976- || Win||align=left| Supernoi Kiatchainairong ||  || Bangkok, Thailand || Decision || 5 || 3:00
|-  style="background:#cfc;"
| 1976-10-05 || Win||align=left| Piti Muangkhonkaen || Lumpinee Stadium || Bangkok, Thailand || Disqualification|| 4 ||

|-  style="background:#cfc;"
| 1976- || Win||align=left| Dechai Koyrungruang ||  || Bangkok, Thailand || Decision || 5 || 3:00
|-  style="background:#cfc;"
| 1976-08-30 || Win||align=left| Panoi Sor Kochasit || Rajadamnern Stadium || Bangkok, Thailand || Decision || 5 || 3:00
|-  style="background:#cfc;"
| 1976- || Win||align=left| Penoi Sakornpitak || Rajadamnern Stadium || Bangkok, Thailand || Decision || 5 || 3:00
|-  style="background:#cfc;"
| 1976- || Win||align=left| Fanoy Saksaendee || Rajadamnern Stadium || Bangkok, Thailand || Decision || 5 || 3:00 
|-
! style=background:white colspan=9 |
|-
| colspan=9 | Legend:

See also
List of male kickboxers

References 

1961 births
Living people
Lightweight kickboxers
Dieselnoi Chor Thanasukarn
Dieselnoi Chor Thanasukarn